Reflections: Carly Simon's Greatest Hits is the fourth greatest hits album by American singer-songwriter Carly Simon, released on May 4, 2004.

Containing 20 tracks and nearly 80 minutes of music; the album compiles 19 of Simon's most popular songs, presented roughly in chronological order, ranging from "That's the Way I've Always Heard It Should Be" from her 1971 eponymous debut album, through "Like A River" and "Touched by the Sun" from her 16th studio album Letters Never Sent (1994). The song "Amity", a duet with her daughter Sally Taylor, originally appeared on the soundtrack album to the 1999 film Anywhere but Here, and has been remixed and included as a bonus track.

An international version of the album, released mainly for the UK market, followed on June 8, 2004. While also containing 20 tracks, the international version consists of a different mix of songs, such as "Why" from the soundtrack album to the 1982 film Soup For One, a Top 10 hit single on the UK chart. Unlike the North American version, the international version does not run in chronological order.

Reception

Reflections: Carly Simon’s Greatest Hits was met with widespread critical and commercial success. It peaked at No. 22 on the U.S. Billboard 200, becoming Simon's first Top 40 release on this chart since Coming Around Again in 1987, and remained on the chart for 19 weeks. On March 2, 2007, it was certified Gold by the RIAA for sales of over 500,000 copies in the U.S. alone. The international version was also very successful; it peaked at No. 25 on the UK Official Albums Chart, and remained on the chart for seven weeks. On July 22, 2013, it was certified Gold by the BPI for selling over 100,000 copies in the UK.

AllMusic rated the North American version 4-stars-out-of-5, praising it as a satisfying single-disc overview of Simon's extensive catalog; "Spanning nearly 30 years and featuring 20 songs, the collection has all of the big hits, from such '70s standards as "That's the Way I've Always Heard It Should Be", "Anticipation", "The Right Thing to Do", "You're So Vain", "Haven't Got Time for the Pain", and "Nobody Does It Better" to the late-'80s comeback hit "Let the River Run". Certainly, there are some listeners who are looking for a concise career-spanning disc, and for them, this suits the bill very well.

Track listings
Credits adapted from the album's liner notes.

North American version

International version
Credits adapted from the album's liner notes.

Notes
 signifies a writer by additional lyrics

Charts and certifications

Weekly charts

Certifications

References

External links
 Carly Simon's Official Website
 Reflections Official web page

2004 greatest hits albums
Carly Simon compilation albums
Albums produced by Paul Samwell-Smith
Albums produced by Richard Perry
Albums arranged by Paul Buckmaster